Crepidomenus australis is a species of beetles in the click beetle family.

Description
Body is black, with reddish legs.

Distribution
This species can be found in the Australian Capital Territory, New South Wales (SE coastal) and Victoria.

References

Elateridae
Beetles described in 1835